For the Good Times is an album by jazz saxophonist Rusty Bryant recorded for the Prestige label in 1973.

Reception

R.D Lankford of AllMusic states, "Things get started with tepid versions of the title track and Roberta Flack's "Killing Me Softly With His Song," both veering dangerously close to Muzak territory. The pieces are salvaged, however, by Joe Beck and Hugh McCracken's guitar work and Hank Jones' steady hand at the keyboards".

Track listing

 "For the Good Times" (Kris Kristofferson) - 5:05   
 "Killing Me Softly with His Song" (Charles Fox, Norman Gimbel) - 5:25   
 "The Last One Out" (Rusty Bryant) - 6:25   
 "Appalachian Green" (Don Hales) - 5:00   
 "A Night in Tunisia" (Dizzy Gillespie, Frank Paparelli) - 5:30   
 "Looking Through the Eyes of Love" (Barry Mann, Cynthia Weil) - 3:40   
 "Theme from Deep Throat" (Robert Whitaker) - 4:30

Personnel
Rusty Bryant - tenor saxophone
Hank Jones - electric piano
Joe Beck, Hugh McCracken - guitar
Tony Levin - bass, electric bass
Steve Gadd - drums

Production
 Ozzie Cadena - producer
 Rudy Van Gelder - engineer

References

Rusty Bryant albums
1973 albums
Prestige Records albums
Albums produced by Ozzie Cadena
Albums recorded at Van Gelder Studio